Lalande-de-Pomerol (literally Lalande of Pomerol) is a commune in the Gironde department in Nouvelle-Aquitaine in southwestern France, that produces red wine.

Population

See also
 Communes of the Gironde department

References

Communes of Gironde